Henry Richard Graves (1818–1882) was an English portrait painter.

Graves was the second son of Thomas Graves, 2nd Baron Graves, and worked as a clerk for the India Board in London. From 1847 he was a portrait painter in London, exhibiting 71 works at the Royal Academy.

Graves married Henrietta Wellesley in 1843 and had a large family.

Notes

External links

1818 births
1882 deaths
English portrait painters
19th-century English painters
English male painters
Younger sons of barons
19th-century English male artists